James Orlando Clement was the Dean of St George's Cathedral, Georgetown, Guyana from 1976 until 1983. He was ordained in 1950 after a period of study at Codrington College, Barbados.  He began his ecclesiastical career with a curacy in Montserrat before being appointed Vicar of St George’s in the same country in 1952. After further incumbencies in Anguilla, Antigua and St Kitts he was appointed to a Guyanese parish (Lodge) in 1967. Nine years later he was elected to the Deanery of the Diocese.

References 

Alumni of Codrington College
Deans of St George's Cathedral, Georgetown
20th-century Guyanese Anglican priests
Living people
Year of birth missing (living people)